was a Japanese all-female band, formed in 2002. They made their major debut in 2007 on Avex's label Sonic Groove. Their songs were used as the theme songs of various Japanese television dramas and variety shows such as Tokumei Kakarichō Tadano Hitoshi, Itadakimuscle, Junk Sports, and DOWN TOWN DX. The band's final performance was on October 31, 2009. Both Tomoko and Reona went on to join Gacharic Spin and Doll$Boxx.

Members 
 Shoco - Real name: Shōko Suzuki (鈴木翔子) - Vocal
 Tomo2 - Real name: Tomoko Midorikawa (翠川智子) - Guitar
 Ayaka - Real name: Ayaka Haraguchi (原口彩香) - Bass
 Reona - Real name: Reona Suzuki (鈴木玲緒奈) - Keyboard (Leader)
 Sawa2 - Real name: Sawako Suzuki (鈴木佐和子) - Drums

Reona and Ayaka founded the band with two other original members, who later quit. Shoco and Tomo² joined in 2005, and Sawa² joined a year later.

Discography

Singles 
  (released on February 14, 2007)
 Single Bed
 Hey!
 Valentine Jealousy

  (released on August 1, 2007)
 Yakusoku
 Struggle
 Cheeky girl

 Proud  (released on March 12, 2008)
 Proud
 Ride On
 With Bright Eyes

Other songs 
Found on the compilation album Spring Harmony: Vision Factory Presents (February 13, 2008):
 Get Your Dreams

Can be bought on Vision Factory's web site for mobile phones:
 Smile New Year

Covers of the following songs are only played at live shows:
 Candy Kiss
 Show Me
 Truth
 Little Wing
 Memories
 My Boy
  (STARS~Song of the Stars~)

These cover songs have been played at live concerts:
Living Loving Maid (Led Zeppelin)
My Happy Ending (Avril Lavigne)
Highway Star (Deep Purple)
You Keep Me Hangin' On (The Supremes)
Satisfaction (The Rolling Stones)

References 
 

Japanese pop music groups
Japanese rock music groups
All-female bands
Musical groups established in 2002
Avex Group artists
2002 establishments in Japan